The Ven. Percy John Dale, OBE,  MA was an  Anglican priest: the Archdeacon of Sarum from 1936 until 1950.
Born on 23 May 1876, he was educated at Magdalen College, Oxford, and  ordained in 1900. He served curacies at Harrow-on-the-Hill (now in Greater London) and Fittleton (Wiltshire), before becoming Rector of Holy Trinity East Grimstead, Wiltshire, a post he held until his archdeacon’s appointment.
He died on 22 April 1957.

References

1876 births
Alumni of Magdalen College, Oxford
Officers of the Order of the British Empire
Archdeacons of Sarum
1957 deaths